Acalolepta defectrix is a species of beetle in the family Cerambycidae. It was described by Francis Polkinghorne Pascoe in 1866. It is known from Java, Singapore and Malaysia.

References

Acalolepta
Beetles described in 1866
Taxa named by Francis Polkinghorne Pascoe